John M. Hoctor (April 15, 1916 – April 21, 2004) was an American football player and coach. He played college football at the University of Maine. He served as the head football coach at Maine Maritime Academy in Castine, Maine from 1946 to 1956. Hoctor was credited with starting the athletic program at Maine Maritime.

References

1916 births
2004 deaths
Maine Black Bears football players
Maine Maritime Mariners football coaches
Sportspeople from Biddeford, Maine
Players of American football from Maine
Coaches of American football from Maine